James George Palmer (November 27, 1875 in Claiborne Parish, Louisiana1952 in Shreveport, Louisiana) was an American lawyer, judge, and politician. He was the son of W. H. Palmer and Mary Frances Palmer (née Monk).

From 1898 to 1904, he was superintendent of schools in Vernon Parish, LA. He was admitted to the Louisiana Bar in March, 1901, in New Orleans, LA. In 1908, he was elected District Attorney of the Twelfth Judicial District and, in 1912, was elected Judge of that judicial district.

In 1914, Judge Palmer resigned from the Twelfth District Court and moved to Shreveport, Caddo Parish, LA, where he had a private law practice. In 1921, he was elected to represent Caddo Parish at the Louisiana State Constitutional Convention.

Judge Palmer was elected Mayor of Shreveport, Louisiana in 1930. He served as Mayor for two years; in 1932 he became a Judge in the Louisiana Circuit Court of Appeal for the Second District.

Judge Palmer was married to the former Genevieve Stone. They had a son, James, who died in infancy. Their three surviving children were Albert Stone Palmer, Emily Francis Palmer and Virginia Palmer.

References

1875 births
1952 deaths
Louisiana lawyers
Louisiana Democrats
Louisiana state court judges
Mayors of Shreveport, Louisiana